Petia Arshinkova (born 26 April 1998) is an inactive Bulgarian tennis player.

Arshinkova has a career-high singles ranking of No. 476 by the WTA, achieved on 29 July 2019. She has won one singles title and three doubles titles on tournaments of the ITF Circuit.

Arshinkova made her Fed Cup debut for Bulgaria in 2018.

She has not competed since July 2021.

ITF Circuit finals

Singles: 1 (title)

Doubles: 9 (3 titles, 6 runner–ups)

Fed Cup
Petia Arshinkova debuted for the Bulgaria Fed Cup team in 2018. Since then, she has a 0–1 singles record and a 1–3 doubles record (1–4 overall).

Singles (0–1)

Doubles (1–3)

External links
 
 
 

1998 births
Living people
Bulgarian female tennis players
Sportspeople from Plovdiv